Dawid Plizga (born 17 November 1985 in Ruda Śląska) is a Polish footballer who plays for Unia Racibórz.

Career

Club
Previously he played for GKS Katowice. He lost almost all of 2006 recovering from a serious injury.

In June 2011, he joined Jagiellonia Białystok on a three-year contract.

On 9 July 2019, Plizga joined KS ROW 1964 Rybnik in the III liga.

National team
On 10 December 2010 he debuted for the senior Polish national team in a friendly match against Bosnia and Herzegovina. 
On 6 February 2011 he scored his first goal for Poland in a friendly match against Moldova. The goal gave Poland a 1–0 victory.

Poland goals

References

External links
 
 
 

1985 births
Living people
Sportspeople from Ruda Śląska
Polish footballers
Zagłębie Lubin players
GKS Katowice players
Jagiellonia Białystok players
Górnik Zabrze players
Bruk-Bet Termalica Nieciecza players
LKS Goczałkowice-Zdrój players
KS ROW 1964 Rybnik players
Ekstraklasa players
I liga players
III liga players
IV liga players
Association football midfielders
Poland international footballers